Cecil Burke Day (December 10, 1934 – December 15, 1978) was an American hotelier, known for founding the hotel chain Days Inn.

Biography
Day studied at Mercer University in Macon, Georgia, but withdrew prior to graduation to join the United States Marine Corps.  After the Marine Corps, Day studied at the Georgia Institute of Technology; he was a member of Sigma Alpha Epsilon fraternity and graduated with a degree in Industrial Management in 1958.

Day owned real estate in Atlanta, Georgia.  He sold a duplex for $4,000,000 and used the funds to open the first Days Inn hotel, which was located on Tybee Island, Georgia.  Day coined the phrase "budget-luxury" and expanded his hotel chain with great success building a large network of franchise hotels.

Day had five children and was Southern Baptist.  He died of cancer in 1978.

Foundation
Cecil B. Day founded the Day Foundation which supported evangelical churches, organizations and Bible Colleges.

Places named in his honor
 The Cecil B. Day Graduate and Professional Campus of Mercer University in Atlanta, Georgia
The Cecil B. Day Chapel at The Carter Center in Atlanta, Georgia

 Cecil B. Day School of Hospitality Administration at Georgia State University
 Cecil B. Day Butterfly Center at Callaway Gardens in Pine Mountain, Georgia
 Cecil B. Day Fitness Center at Dunwoody Baptist Church in Dunwoody, Georgia
 Day Chapel at Atlanta's Perimeter Church
 Cecil B. Day Auditorium at the North American Mission Board Headquarters in Alpharetta, Georgia

Images

References

American hoteliers
1934 births
1979 deaths
Mercer University alumni
Georgia Tech alumni
20th-century American businesspeople
People from Bulloch County, Georgia
Deaths from cancer in Georgia (U.S. state)